Michael John Coulman (born 6 May 1944) is an English former rugby football footballer, and coach. He played at the highest levels in both rugby union and rugby league - a dual-code rugby international.

Playing career

Rugby union
Coulman played club rugby union for Moseley, and was capped nine times as a prop for the England national rugby union team between 1967 and 1968 and scored one try for England. He was selected for the 1968 British Lions tour to South Africa, and started the 3rd Test against South Africa, but lasted only 5 minutes of the game before tearing the ligaments round his ankle.

Rugby league
After 1968 he signed for Salford where he won two championship medals. He was selected in the England squad for the 1975 Rugby League World Cup, and made two tournament appearances - the 10 June 1975 pool match against Wales in Brisbane the 28 June match against Australia at the SCG. Coulman's Testimonial match at Salford took place in 1979. He also appeared for Other Nationalities and Lancashire.

County Cup Final appearances
Mike Coulman played right-, i.e. number 12, and was man of the match in Salford's 2-6 defeat by Widnes in the 1974 Lancashire County Cup Final during the 1974–75 season at Central Park, Wigan on Saturday 2 November 1974.

BBC2 Floodlit Trophy Final appearances
Mike Coulman played left-, i.e. number 8, in Salford's 0-0 draw with Warrington in the 1974 BBC2 Floodlit Trophy Final during the 1974–75 season at The Willows, Salford on Tuesday 17 December 1974, and he did not play (Alan Grice played left-) in the 10-5 victory over Warrington in the 1974 BBC2 Floodlit Trophy Final replay during the 1974–75 season at Wilderspool Stadium, Warrington on Tuesday 28 January 1975.

Coaching career
Following his retirement as a player, Coulman coached Salford for the 1983–84 Rugby Football League season. He was replaced at the end of the season by Kevin Ashcroft following the club's relegation at the end of the season.

References

External links

1944 births
Living people
British & Irish Lions rugby union players from England
Dual-code rugby internationals
England international rugby union players
England national rugby league team players
English rugby league coaches
English rugby league players
English rugby union players
Great Britain national rugby league team players
Lancashire rugby league team players
Moseley Rugby Football Club players
Other Nationalities rugby league team players
Rugby league players from Staffordshire
Rugby league props
Rugby league second-rows
Rugby union players from Stafford
Rugby union props
Salford Red Devils coaches
Salford Red Devils players
Rugby articles needing expert attention